The Hannah Montana book series is a series based on the Disney Channel original series Hannah Montana.

Series novelizations

Hannah Montana
 Keeping Secrets -  Miley Get Your Gum & It's My Party And I'll Lie If I Want To.
 Face-Off - You're So Vain, You Probably Think This Zit Is About You & Ooh, Ooh, Itchy Woman. 
 Super Sneak -She's A Super Sneak & I Can't Make You Love Hannah If You Don't.
 Truth Or Dare - Oops! I Meddled Again & It's A Mannequin's World.
 Hold On Tight - O Say, Can You Remember The Words? & On The Road Again.
 Crush-Tastic! - Good Golly, Miss Dolly & Mascot Love.
 Nightmare On Hannah Street - Torn Between Two Hannahs & Grandma Don't Let Your Babies Grow Up To Be Favorites.
 Seeing Green - More Than A Zombie To Me & People Who Use People.
 Face The Music - Smells Like Teen Sellout & We Are Family, Now Get Me Some Water!.
 Don't Bet On It - Bad Moose Rising & My Boyfriend's Jackson And There's Gonna Be Trouble.
 Sweet Revenge - The Idol Side Of Me & School Bully.
 Win Or Lose - Money For Nothing, Guilt For Free & Debt It Be.
 True Blue - Cuffs will Keep Us Together & Me and Rico Down by the Schoolyard.
 On the Road - Get Down, Study-udy-udy & I Want You to Want Me... to Go to Florida.
 Game of Hearts - My Best Friend's Boyfriend & You are So Sue-able to Me.
 Wishful Thinking - When You Wish You Were The Star & Take This Job and Love It
 One of a Kind - I am Hannah, Hear Me Croak & You Gotta Not Fight for Your Right to Party.
 Superstar Secrets - Achy, Jakey Heart (Parts One and Two).
 Reality Check - Song Sung Bad & Sleepwalk This Way.
 Hit or Miss - Me and Mr. Jonas and Mr. Jonas and Mr. Jonas & Everybody was Best Friend Fighting

Other novelizations
 Hannah Montana: The Movie
 Rock the Waves
 Swept Up
 In the Loop

Hannah Montana: On tour

 Ciao from Rome!
 G'day, Sydney!
Greetings from Brazil!
Live from London!

References
 Disney Books - All Hannah Montana books
 Hannah Montana #1-20 on Goodreads

Hannah Montana